Nanoc is a Ruby-based website compiler that generates static HTML. It supports compiling from various markup languages, including Markdown, Textile, and Haml. It can generate and lay out pages with a consistent look and feel. Nanoc is not a content management system, however it acts somewhat like one.

Advantages of Nanoc 

In comparison to other static site generators, Nanoc has a modular architecture.

Differences from traditional content management systems 
Although Nanoc sometimes acts as a content management system (CMS), there are many differences.
 Traditional CMSs must assemble the webpage every time a user requests it. Static HTML pages are pre-assembled and as such do not have to be re-assembled.
 CMSs run using a server-side language, which exposes the CMS to all the vulnerabilities of the language. Since Nanoc compiles websites to static HTML, the only vulnerabilities are that of the web server itself.
 The content managed by a CMS can usually be changed at any time through a web interface. Since Nanoc must recompile the website at every change, it is more difficult to modify a website.

References

External links 
 Official project website
 

Command-line software
Compilers
Free static website generators